Mughalsarai is a constituency of the Uttar Pradesh Legislative Assembly covering the city of Mughalsarai in the Chandauli district of Uttar Pradesh, India. It is one of five assembly constituencies in the Chandauli Lok Sabha constituency. Since 2008, this assembly constituency is numbered 380 amongst 403 constituencies.

As of 2022, the Member of Legislative Assembly from the seat is Bharatiya Janta Party candidate Ramesh Jaiswal who won in the 2022 Uttar Pradesh Legislative Assembly election by defeating Samajwadi Party candidate Chandra Shekhar Yadav by a margin of 14,921 votes.

Election results

2022 

 

 |party      = Bharatiya Janata Party
  |candidate  = Ramesh Jaiswal
  |votes      = 102,216
  |percentage = 42.4 
  |change     =

2017

References

External links
 

Assembly constituencies of Uttar Pradesh
Pandit Deen Dayal Upadhyaya Nagar